Nanticoke River Wildlife Management Area is a Wildlife Management Area in Wicomico County, Maryland near Quantico, Maryland.

External links
 Nanticoke River Wildlife Management Area

Wildlife management areas of Maryland
Protected areas of Wicomico County, Maryland
Nanticoke River